Ehecatotontli is an Aztec group of gods that are forms of Ehecatl.  They are also known as Ehecacoamixtli. The Ehecatotontli are Mictlanpachecatl, Cihuatecayotl, Tlalocayotl, and Huitztlampaehecatl.

References

Aztec gods